The Kansas Department of Administration (KDA) is a department of the state of Kansas under the Governor of Kansas. KDA is responsible for providing many administrative services to the State's bureaus and departments, including payroll, maintenance of public buildings, and information technology. KDA is administered by the Secretary of Administration, who is appointed by the Governor with the approval of the Kansas Senate.

The current Secretary of Administration is DeAngela Burns-Wallace, who was appointed by Governor Laura Kelly on June 7, 2019.

Divisions
Accounts and Reports Division – provides statewide accounting and payroll, financial reporting services
Budget Division – responsible for drafting the Governor's annual budget and overseeing its implementation
Information Technology Office – responsible for providing statewide information technology service 
Facilities Management Division – responsible for overseeing maintenance and construction of State buildings
Office of Chief Counsel – responsible for providing internal legal services to the Department
Office of Personnel – responsible for managing internal human resource issues for the Department
Personnel Services Division – responsible for providing statewide human resource administration, benefit administration and workforce management
Printing Division – responsible for providing statewide printing services
Purchasing Division – responsible for providing statewide bid solicitations, purchasing agreements and statewide contracts

See also
General Services Administration

References

External links

Kansas Department of Administration publications online at the KGI Online Library (scroll down to agency)

Administration, Department of